ShellShock Live is a multiplayer artillery strategy video game developed and published by kChamp Games based in California, United States. It is the successor of two flash games in the ShellShock Live series released between 2010 and 2012 by the same developer. It was released on platforms such as Microsoft Windows, Mac, Linux, Xbox One, and PlayStation 4 and is now available on mobile platforms Android and iOS as of 5/12/2022.

Gameplay 

Players control tanks in a 2D landscape. They aim and shoot the enemy tanks to defeat them with their own in team or free-for-all matches. Shots can be fired after maneuvering its trajectory by adjusting its angle by 360° and power by 0-100. Up to 8 players can play in a match. There are nine game modes, including Deathmatch, Points, Assassin, Juggernaut, Rebound, Marksman, Charge, Shoccer and Vortex. There are 418 weapons that can be obtained by leveling up, completing challenges, or bought in the shop. The game also offers stat and cosmetic upgrades for player tanks and its maps.

Campaign 
ShellShock Live also offers a single player campaign mode with eight different sections consisting of ten levels each with an additional  ten bonus levels to play after beating all levels including the Final Boss level in the last world "Showdown". The campaign offers players the chance to learn many different core mechanics of the game and gives them a variety of challenges to overcome. There are a total of 90 levels in the campaign including the bonus levels.

Shop and Game Currency 
The game also has a shop known as the Gear Shop where players can buy weapons, maps, themes, tank parts, victory tunes, and items. The game currency is a gear which spawn from explosions in multiplayer matches where players must pick gears up by clicking them.

Leveling System and Experience 
ShellShock Live has a unique leveling system ranging with levels 1 to 100 which players obtain experience by doing damage, killing players, and completing challenges. Once players reach level 100 they stop leveling up and there is a badge system where at one million experience players receive one star,  two stars at 1.5 million, three stars at 2.5 million, four stars at 5 million, and five stars at 10 million. There is also a skill tree with four branches with 25 upgrades per branch which players get one upgrade every time they level up and two on their final level up.

Release 
It was released as early access on March 11, 2015 on Steam for PC. On March 8, 2019 it was released on Xbox One and on September 13 of the same year on PlayStation 4.

External links

References 

2015 video games
Steam Greenlight games
Multiplayer video games
Linux games
MacOS games
PlayStation 4 games
Video games developed in the United States
Windows games
Xbox One games
Early access video games
Artillery video games
Multiplayer online games
Flash games ported to consoles